Amy Victoria Wadge (born ) is an English singer and songwriter. She has co-written tracks with Ed Sheeran, including "Thinking Out Loud" for which she won the 2016 Grammy Award for Song of the Year.

Early life
Wadge was born and brought up in Backwell, a small village just outside Bristol, England. Her father's passion for music influenced her enormously, and on the subject of her paternal influences she has said that she "grew up listening to early Elton John, Joni Mitchell and James Taylor. That was the stuff I cut my teeth on and now I listen to everything you can possibly imagine from hip hop to country".

She began to write her own songs at the age of 9 on the family piano. When she was 11, her parents bought her her first guitar from a junk shop. It was when Wadge taught herself to play along to Tracy Chapman's debut album that she discovered her affinity for the guitar.

While still at school, Wadge regularly gigged around Bristol. At the age of 14, she signed her first record deal, along with her band Two uv a Mind. She released her first single at the age of 16.

Career

Songwriting
Apart from writing songs for herself, Wadge has been active in collaborating with new performers in Britain, most notably Ed Sheeran. The two collaborated on a number of songs, and Sheeran titled his self-released 2010 EP Songs I Wrote with Amy. One track was included with the deluxe edition of Sheeran's album +. Wadge continued her collaborative relationship with Sheeran in 2014. The single "Thinking Out Loud", written on a guitar given to Sheeran, features on the album x.

Wadge has also written with Lewis Watson, with tracks "Halo" and "Sink or Swim" appearing on the album The Morning (All of the Songs). She has collaborated with Shannon Saunders, Anna Pancaldi and other notable artists. She wrote and performed the songs for the soundtrack of the BBC Wales series Keeping Faith in 2018, and for the second series, shown in 2019. Wadge also co-wrote Consequences, the third single from Camila Cabello's debut album Camila.

Also in 2019, Amy wrote three tracks ( ‘Older’, ‘Bad For Loving You’ and ‘To The Moon and Back’) specifically for the Bonnie Tyler album 'Between the Earth and the Stars.]

In 2021 she co-wrote All Of My Friends of Bridge Over Troubled Dreams by Delta Goodrem

In 2022 she co-wrote the UK's entry to the Eurovision Song Contest, "Space Man" by Sam Ryder.

Solo performer
Having moved to Wales and graduated from the Royal Welsh College of Music and Drama, Wadge started performing at open mic sessions in Cardiff's Toucan Club and soon started developing a fanbase and gaining critical recognition. She was quickly spotted and received encouragement from some of the big players in the city, among them Manics/Catatonia/Super Furry Animals producer Greg Haver, who recorded her debut mini-album, The Famous Hour. This album "brought her more attention and acclaim". She played alongside Stereophonics, Embrace and Lenny Kravitz at the launch party for BBC 6 Music.

In 2002, Wadge won "Best Female Solo Act" at the annual Welsh Music Awards, ahead of Charlotte Church. In 2003, she toured Australia with the Welsh Rugby Team during the Rugby World Cup with the song "Adre Nôl".  Later that year, she retained her "Best Female Solo Act" at the Welsh Music Awards.

2004 saw her release her first full album, WOJ (a play on her surname, which is often mispronounced), to critical acclaim. In June 2004, she performed at London's Royal Albert Hall on a bill that included Jeff Beck and Jan Hammer, charted by Billboard magazine as one of the world's top-grossing concerts of the summer.

2006 saw the release of Wadge's second album, No Sudden Moves. The album includes a cover of the Manic Street Preachers single A Design for Life. 2008 saw the release of her third album, Bump, which (according to her own sleeve notes) was recorded over two days when she was 8 months pregnant. It includes a cover of "Don't Leave Me This Way" (originally recorded by Harold Melvin & the Blue Notes, and later covered by The Communards).

On Monday 2 November 2009, Wadge released her new single "Hold Me" with new record label, Choice Music. She also released a Welsh version of the track ("") which was a fundraiser for her daughter's  (Welsh nursery school), with 20p from the sale of every Welsh language download being donated to Mudiad Meithrin, a Welsh language nursery organisation.

In 2010 and 2011, Wadge and Pete Riley released a CD (Rivers Apart), as well as two live DVDs, and toured extensively together.
Her single "USA? We'll Wait and See" was released in both English and Welsh.

She occasionally presents shows on BBC Radio Wales. She presented Suck It and See'', a programme about the harmonica on BBC Radio 4.

Personal life
Wadge is married to actor Alun ap Brinley. They live near Pontypridd, in Wales.

Songwriting credits

Discography

Albums

EPs and singles

Other charted songs

Awards

References

External links

Official Amy Wadge website

1975 births
English folk musicians
Alumni of the Royal Welsh College of Music & Drama
Living people
People from Backwell
Grammy Award winners
21st-century English women singers
21st-century English singers